Benclare is an unincorporated community in the extreme southeastern corner of Minnehaha County, South Dakota, United States.

Geography
Benclare sits 1½ miles west of the Minnesota border and ½ mile north of the border with Iowa. Benclare is also located 1 mile east of South Dakota Highway 42.

History
Benclare was founded on September 24, 1888, by a New York native, Benjamin Richards for his two sons Benjamin and Clarence, hence Benclare.

References

Unincorporated communities in South Dakota
Unincorporated communities in Minnehaha County, South Dakota
Sioux Falls, South Dakota metropolitan area